Gaussia princeps may refer to:

 Gaussia princeps (plant), a palm species endemic to Cuba
 Gaussia princeps (crustacean), a mesopelagic copepod species found in the Pacific Ocean

See also 
 G. princeps (disambiguation)